Candlewick Press, established in 1992 and located in Somerville, Massachusetts, is part of the Walker Books group. The logo depicting a bear carrying a candle is based on Walker Books's original logo. 

Sebastian Walker launched Walker Books from his spare bedroom in his London home in 1978. Walker Books grew and he founded Candlewick Press in 1992. Candlewick Press opened with only six employees and now has more than one hundred.

Candlewick was first known for picture books but expanded to include board books, novelty books, e-books and middle-grade and young adult fiction and non-fiction. Candlewick is an important children's book publisher thanks to publications such as a series known as the Ologies; Robert Sabuda and Matthew Reinhart's pop-up books; the Judy Moody and Stink franchises from author Megan McDonald and illustrator Peter H. Reynolds; Guess How Much I Love You; Martin Handford's Where's Waldo? books; Lucy Cousins' Maisy Mouse books, and National Book Award winner The Astonishing Life of Octavian Nothing, Volume 1: The Pox Party by M. T. Anderson. Candlewick's books continue to be in demand as demonstrated by recent The New York Times bestsellers I Want My Hat Back and This is Not My Hat (also winner of the 2012 Caldecott Medal) by Jon Klassen and Timmy Failure: Mistakes Were Made by Stephan Pastis.

Candlewick Press is home to author Kate DiCamillo, having published her first novel, Because of Winn-Dixie (a Newbery Honor Book), along with The Tiger Rising (a National Book Award finalist), The Tale of Despereaux and Flora & Ulysses (Newbery Medal winners), The Miraculous Journey of Edward Tulane (a Boston Globe-Horn Book Award winner), the Mercy Watson series and Tales from Deckawoo Drive series of early readers, and The Magician's Elephant. 

M. T. Anderson, author of the award-winning Octavian Nothing series of speculative historical fiction, is another of Candlewick's authors.

Toon Books was an imprint of Candlewick Press from 2010 to 2014.

Nosy Crow was an imprint of Candlewick Press from 2011 to 2022.

Candlewick Press is the proud publisher of Meg Medina, the 2023-2024 National Ambassador for Young People's Literature. She is a Cuban American author who writes for readers of all ages. Meg Medina has received numerous awards for her writing including the John Newbery medal for her middle grade novel, Merci Suárez Changes Gears.

The Walker Books Group is made up of Candlewick Press, Walker Books UK and Walker Books Australia. In May 2020, the group was acquired by Trustbridge Global Media.

Templar Books

Templar Books is Candlewick's first imprint and is a partnership between Candlewick Press and Templar Publishing in the UK. This imprint publishes picture books, novelty books and board books. Notable titles include Jonny Duddle's The Pirates Next Door and Levi Pinfold's Black Dog, which received the Kate Greenaway Medal in 2013.

Big Picture Press
Big Picture Press landed in the Fall of 2013 and publishes illustrated and high-quality books for readers of all ages. The imprint was developed by Templar Publishing in the U.K. as an alternative to digital publishing. Notable titles include Maps by Aleksandra Mizielinska and Daniel Mizielinski, and a reissue of Nina's Book of Little Things by Keith Haring.

Candlewick Entertainment
Candlewick Entertainment launched in Spring 2014 to publish media-related children's books and TV and movie tie-ins, including Peppa Pig.

Candlewick Studio
Candlewick Studio launched in Fall 2016 and publishes design-centric books with creators such as Ingela P. Arrhenius, élo, David Ellwand, Aaron Becker, and Carme Lemniscates.

MIT Kids Press and MITeen Press
The MIT Kids Press and MITeen Press imprints, launched in Fall 2021, are an innovative collaboration that pairs the expertise, reach, and creativity of both Candlewick Press and the MIT Press. The imprints offer lively, fascinating, and far-reaching writing on STEAM topics for young people and young adults.

Walker Books US
A division of Candlewick Press, Walker Books US, launched in Fall 2018 and focuses on publishing fiction, graphic novels, and illustrated books for children and teens.

References

External links

Book publishing companies based in Massachusetts
Companies based in Middlesex County, Massachusetts
Somerville, Massachusetts
American companies established in 1992
Publishing companies established in 1992
1992 establishments in Massachusetts
Children's book publishers